Ferré Gola, also Ferre Gola, whose full name is Hervé Gola Bataringe, is a DR Congolese recording artist. He at one time was a member of legendary  Congolese bands, Wenge Musica Maison Mère and Quartier Latin International.

Background
He was born on 3 March 1976, in Kinshasa, the largest city and capital of the Democratic Republic of the Congo. From an early age, he was passionate about becoming a professional musician. Ferré Gola began his career in a band in Bandalungwa commune called "Rumba des Jeunes" before making his historic entry in "Wenge Musica" in 1995.

At the split of this group, Ferré Gola joined Werrason in Wenge Musica Maison Mère for 7 years, before creating with Bill Clinton Kalonji and JDT Mulopwe "Les Marquis de Maison mère". But, "Les Marquis" burst out a few months later after the triumphant release of the opus "Miracles", best album at the KORA awards 2005 in South Africa.

Career
In 1995 during at a talent fair in Bandalungwa, one the city of Kinshasa's communes, he was spotted and recruited by Werrason into the group Wenge Musica 4*4. When that band broke up, Gola, Werrason, Didier Masela, and Adolphe created the group Wenge Musica Maison Mère where he spent seven years from 1997 to 2004. He left the group Werrason in 2004 to found The Marquis de Maison Mère with JDT Mulopwe and Bill Clinton Kalonji who also left Werrason. In 2005, Gola joined the group Quartier Latin International, of Koffi Olomide, leaving for a solo career in 2006, the same year Fally Ipupa left. While at Quartier Latin, one of the memorable hits he produced was the song Sisi Silvie Remix where he collaborated with Olomide.

His music
With his real name Hervé Gola Bateringe, Ferré has made an exceptional artistic journey which has earned him his current success. He is well known for his work, and is surrounded by a team of young ladies and gentlemen who are well-established both in his administration and in his orchestra, among others: Chikito, Kunzardo, Charly Solo, Mark House, Guy Digital, De Gaulle and others. Before embracing the solo career, Ferré Gola produced five songs including Vita Imana, Victime d'amour , 100 Kilos, Amour Intèret, Insecticide and others.

Discography 
Since the debut of his solo career, Gola released three full-length albums:

 Sens Interdit (2007)
 Lubukulukumu - Maxi (2008)
 Qui Est Derrière Toi ? (2009)
 Avant Goût - EP (2012)
 Boîte Noire (2013)
 Dérangement - EP (2014)
 QQJD (2017)
 Dynastie (2022)

With WMMM 

 Force D’Intervention Rapide (1998)
 Solola Bien (1999)
 Terrain Eza Miné (2000)
 Kibuisa Mpimpa (2001)
 À La Queue Leu-Leu (2002)
 Tindika Lokito (2003)

With Les Marquis 

 Miracles (2004)

With Quartier Latin 

 Boma Nga N’Elengi (2005)
 Danger de Mort (2006)

Awards

WatsUp TV Africa Music Video Awards

|-
|2016
|Tucheze
|Best Central African Video 
|
|-
|}

Canal Dór Awards

|-
|2016
|Tucheze
|Best  African Artist 
|
|-
|}

See also
 Koffi Olomide
 Fally Ipupa
 Cindy Le Coeur
 Bouro Mpela
 Gibson Butukondolo
Kasaloo Kyanga
 Quartier Latin International

References

External links
Ferre Gola Discography

Living people
1976 births
People from Kinshasa
21st-century Democratic Republic of the Congo male singers
Democratic Republic of the Congo songwriters
Democratic Republic of the Congo musicians
Soukous musicians
Quartier Latin International